Hamdan Bayusuf (born September 29, 1994) is a Kenyan swimmer. He competed at the 2016 Summer Olympics in the men's 100 metre backstroke event; his time of 1:00.28 in the heats did not qualify him for the semifinals.

He also competed at the 2015 African Games.

References

1994 births
Living people
Kenyan male swimmers
Olympic swimmers of Kenya
Swimmers at the 2016 Summer Olympics
Commonwealth Games competitors for Kenya
Swimmers at the 2014 Commonwealth Games
Male backstroke swimmers
Swimmers at the 2015 African Games
African Games competitors for Kenya